James Kelly was a Scottish professional footballer who played as an inside left.

Kelly was recruited from Glasgow and was paid £22 signing on fee. He played the first eight league matches of the 1892-93 campaign scoring just once against Small Heath, he was considered as skillful but had a poor shot and was dropped.

References

Scottish footballers
Association football inside forwards
Lincoln City F.C. players
English Football League players
Year of death missing
Year of birth missing
Place of birth missing
Place of death missing